Gregor Šparovec (born 29 December 1977 in Jesenice) is a Slovenian former alpine skier who competed in the 2002 Winter Olympics.

External links
 

1977 births
Living people
Slovenian male alpine skiers
Olympic alpine skiers of Slovenia
Alpine skiers at the 2002 Winter Olympics
Sportspeople from Jesenice, Jesenice